Countess Sofia Vladimirovna Panina (Russian: Софья Владимировна Панина; 23 August 1871 – 16 June 1956) was Vice Minister of State Welfare and Vice Minister of Education in the Provisional Government following the Russian February Revolution, 1917. She was the last member of the aristocratic Panin family.

Family background
Countess Sofia Vladimirovna Panina was the daughter of Count Vladimir Viktorovich Panin and Anastasiia Sergeevna Maltsova.  Her maternal grandfather, General Sergei Ivanovich Mal'tsov (1801–93)  was an industrialist whose diverse enterprises once employed over 100,000 workers. Count Viktor Nikitich Panin, her paternal grandfather, was one of Russia's richest serfowners as well as Minister of Justice for over twenty five years. Panina's father died in 1872 when she was not even two years old, leaving her the principal heir of the enormous Panin fortune. Her mother, who served as trustee of her inheritance, remarried in 1882. Her second father, was one of the founders of the Russian liberal movement against the autocracy, later co-founder in 1905 of the major liberal party, the Constitutional Democrat Party (Kadets).  Petrunkevich had been arrested and sent into internal exile in 1879 for his oppositionist activity, and Anastasia's marriage to  him greatly alarmed the Panin family. Sofia Panina's paternal grandmother, Countess Natalia Pavlovna Panina, successfully petitioned Emperor Alexander III to remove eleven-year-old Sofia from her mother's custody, and enrolled her at the Catherine Institute in St Petersburg, one of the elite boarding schools for noble girls. Entering Petersburg society after graduation, Sofia Panina married a millionaire Alexander Polovstov in 1890. He was the homosexual son of Alexander Polovtsov by Alexander II's cousin. By 1896, however, she had divorced him and reverted to her maiden name. They had no children, and she never officially remarried.

Charitable work

In 1891 Sofia Panina met a Petersburg schoolteacher twenty years older than herself, Aleksandra Vasil'evna Peshekhonova, to whose influence she attributed the decisive turn her life took in the 1890s, away from the world of aristocratic high society and toward progressive philanthropy. Panina and Peshekhonova first created a caféteria for poor schoolchildren in a working-class district of Saint Petersburg.  They gradually added Sunday popular readings for the children's parents and older siblings, founded a library, and began offering evening courses for adults. In 1903 Panina employed Julius Benois to build one central building to house all of the diverse services she and Peshekhonova had started in the 1890s, known as Ligovsky People's House, for working-class residents of the same impoverished district on southern outskirts of Saint Petersburg. It pursued a progressive mission to advance popular education, cultural elevation, and rational entertainment for adults and children, as part of her project to support their development as citizens. The building still operates as a community center in Saint Petersburg today, under the name of the Railroad Workers' Palace of Culture.  Its evening courses and literary circles provided a meeting-place for working-class men with socialist sympathies, and during the 1905 Revolution, Panina opened Ligovsky People's House to various political groups for meetings and rallies. On 9 May 1906 Vladimir Lenin addressed his first mass meeting in Russia there.
Panina also was a co-founder and major financial supporter of the Russian Society for the Protection of Women in 1900, an anti-prostitution organization. In addition to building schools and hospitals on her various estate, she also provided assistance to countless individuals. In 1901 she loaned her Crimean estate, Gaspra, to the novelist Leo Tolstoy, then suffering from a life-threatening illness; Tolstoy and his family lived at her estate for almost a year.

Political career

Although her mother had married Petrunkevitch, it was not until the February Revolution of 1917 that Sofia started playing a role in politics. She wrote in her memoirs: "I never belonged to any political party and my interests were concentrated on questions of education and general culture, which alone, I was deeply convinced, could provide a firm foundation for a free political order." However, during the war she worked for Saint Petersburg City Duma ensuring the families of reservists called up for the war were being looked after. On International Women's Day, 1917, Panina along with some other suitable women were appointed as delegates to the Petrograd (Saint Petersburg) Duma. Their positions were confirmed in the August elections. She was elected to the Kadet Party Central Committee at the beginning of May and was soon the first woman in world history to hold a cabinet position when she became assistant minister in the newly created Ministry of State Welfare, under Minister Prince Dmitrii Shakhovskoi. Then in August she was made assistant minister of education under Sergei Oldenburg, the Minister of Education. The Kadet Party placed her on its Petrograd list of candidates for the elections to the Constituent Assembly, held in mid-November, but the party failed to gain enough votes to include her among its delegates.

However, when the Kadet Party was faced with the revolution of October 1917, Sofia was to play an even more prominent role. On the night of 25 October the Duma sent her as one of three delegates to visit the Aurora in an unsuccessful attempt to persuade them to hold their fire. Also the Central Committee of the Kadet Party met there. As part of the Little Council she was involved in trying to withhold finances from the various ministries from the Bolsheviks and in organising a strike by civil servants. She was arrested at her home on 28 November with  Fyodor Kokoshkin, Andrei Ivanovich Shingarev and Prince Pavel Dolgorukov. They had been planning an anti-bolshevik demonstration for the next day.

Trial

Sofia Panina was put on trial by the Revolutionary Tribunal of the Petrograd Soviet on 10 December 1917 in what was the first political trial organised by the Bolsheviks. She was accused of embezzling 93,000 rubles from the Ministry of Education, which she denied. It attracted both national and international attention, including the presence of John Reed and Louise Bryant. The trial was held in the Nicholas Palace. Julia Cassady has described the trial as showing "nascent theatricality of the Bolshevik law court."

The Revolutionary tribunal consisted of seven men, two soldiers and five workers, six of whom were members of the Bolshevik Party. The soldiers were in uniform, while the workers wore dark suits with high white collar shirts and ties. Panina wore a modest black suit and close fitting turban. Ivan Zhukov chaired the proceedings, citing historical precedents from the French Revolution. He announced the charge and called on someone to act as prosecutor. When no-one stepped forward, the educator whom Panina had designated as her defense,  proceeded with the defense, suggesting that there was no universally recognized laws in Russia at that point of time, so the trial could only be a political affair. He identified the funds in question as being a donation to the Ministry of Education for charitable purposes. "You must not, before the entire world, return evil for good and violence for love". This received much applause from the audience.

Unexpectedly, a factory worker in the audience, N. I. Ivanov, a member of the Socialist Revolutionary Party, asked to address the court. He gave an emotional, personal account of how he had learnt to read and write at Panina's Narodnyi Dom. This too was well received by the audience and Zhukov then asked her to return the money in question within two days.  She refused explaining she had deposited the money in a bank under the name of the Constituent Assembly, and insisted that it should  only be released to the Constituent Assembly. After bypassing Grigory Kramarov, a Menshevik member of the All-Russian Congress of Soviets, Zhukov invited a worker called Naumov to speak. He felt little need to focus on any facts, but merely identified Panina as member of the nobility and suggested that this was enough to determine her guilt, whatever her good deeds in the past. The next to testify was even less sympathetic. Rogal’skii was a representative of the Commissariat for Education, who engaged in a personal attack on Panina which claimed that the funds she took were unpaid wages owed to ministry workers called for military service. Finally Panina herself made a speech in her defense, claiming she was merely playing the role of a sentry safeguarding the funds for the people - as expressed through their legal representation, the Constituent Assembly.

As the Tribunal retired to consider their verdict, the court room gave way to disorder. Sergei Oldenburg accused Rogal’skii of lying. Kramarov complained about not being allowed to speak and was removed from the building when he tried to do so on the tribunal's return. The tribunal then found her guilty of "opposition to the people’s authority" and decreed that she should give the money to the Commissariat for Education. However, in view of her previous good works, her punishment was limited to public censure. Following the trial she refused to pass over the money and was put back in prison until her friends paid the 93,000 rubles.

Flight and emigration
In 1918 she joined General Anton Denikin in South Russia alongside other leading Kadets, including Nikolai Ivanovich Astrov. Although they never married, Astrov and Panina lived as husband and wife until his death in 1934. She traveled with him to Paris in the summer of 1919 to represent Denikin in an attempt to get further support from allies for the White Russians. This failed and she returned to South Russia until the defeat of Denikin's Volunteer Army forced her to flee Russia forever in March 1920. Panina spent the rest of her life in emigration, first in Geneva, where she and Astrov lived from 1921 to 1924. As representatives of one of the major Russian emigre associations, Zemgor, they represented Russian refugee interests at the League of Nations High Commission for Refugees. In 1924 Panina was invited to Prague, Czechoslovakia, by the Czechoslovakian government to become the director of Russkii ochag (Russian Hearth), a community center for Russian emigres.  Astrov died in 1934, and when faced with the Nazi takeover of Czechoslovakia, she left Europe in December 1938 for the United States. After living for about a year in Los Angeles, Panina settled in New York City, where she collaborated with Alexandra Lvovna Tolstaya, Leo Tolstoy's youngest daughter, in founding the Tolstoy Foundation. First created to assist Russian emigres stranded in Europe as the threat of war grew, the Tolstoy Foundation soon became an important organization for assistance to prisoners of war and displaced persons. Panina died in New York City in June 1956.

Further reading

 Adele Lindenmeyr. Citizen Countess: Sofia Panina and the Fate of Revolutionary Russia (University of Wisconsin Press, 2019)

References

1871 births
1956 deaths
Russian Constitutional Democratic Party members
Russian nobility
Ministers of the Russian Provisional Government
White Russian emigrants to the United States
Women government ministers of Russia
20th-century Russian women politicians